The Dornier Do Y was a German bomber of the 1930s, the second bomber design by Dornier Flugzeugwerke.

Development
Design on the aircraft began in 1930, to follow up from the other Dornier bomber prototype, the Dornier Do P. The first aircraft flew on 17 October 1931. It was a shoulder-wing monoplane of all-metal construction with fixed tailwheel landing gear, similar to the Do P, however this model had three engines instead of four. A civil transport version was proposed as the Dornier Do U, but this was never produced.

Operational history
The Do P and Do Y were displayed in the early 1930s as freighter prototypes; they were in fact evolutionary steps towards creating the Luftwaffe's first operational bomber, the Dornier Do 11a. Two examples were produced for the Royal Yugoslav Air Force in 1931, followed by two more machines six years later. All four served with the 81st regiment at Mostar-Ortijes until replaced by the Savoia-Marchetti SM.79 in 1939. The aircraft were then relegated to transport and liaison roles until all four were captured by German forces at Kraljevo in 1941. One of them was subsequently handed over to the Air Force of the Independent State of Croatia.

Fast passenger aircraft Do 15
In 1932, Dornier worked on two aircraft with the Wnr. 243 and 244. They were originally ordered by Yugoslavia, but then cancelled. These aircraft were part of the Do K and Do Y projects. There was a request for tender by Deutsche Luft Hansa and the Reich Air Ministry for a fast passenger aircraft - which in fact was to get a fast bomber. Dornier offered the design with the new naming Dornier Do 15. The same request lead to the superior designs, Heinkel He 111 and Junkers Ju 86. This caused Dornier to develop a new design, the Dornier Do 17.

Operators

Royal Yugoslav Air Force

Specifications (Do Y - 9K engines)

See also

References

Bibliography

Further reading
World Aircraft Information Files. Brightstar Publishing, London. File 892 Sheet 26

1930s German bomber aircraft
Do Y
Trimotors
Shoulder-wing aircraft
Aircraft first flown in 1930